Abed Khalaf Daoudieh (23 April 1920 – 10 January 2015) was a Jordanian politician. He served as Awqaf and Islamic Affairs minister in 1984. He later served as governor of the governorates of Irbid, Balqa and Ma'an.

References

1920 births
2015 deaths
Islamic affairs ministers of Jordan